Klokkarvik is a village in Øygarden municipality in Vestland county, Norway.  The village is located on the southeastern part of the island of Sotra, approximately 40 minutes outside the city of Bergen.  It lies along the coast of Sotra, at the confluence of the Raunefjorden, Fanafjorden, and Korsfjorden.  The islands of Lerøyna and Bjelkarøyna lie just east off the coast of Klokkarvik.

Sund Church is located in Klokkarvik.

References

Villages in Vestland
Øygarden